Dracula: The Series is a syndicated series about Count Dracula, and was broadcast from September 29, 1990, to May 11, 1991.

Plot
Count Dracula is using the alias of "Alexander Lucard", and is a wealthy tycoon (the name 'A. Lucard' being 'Dracula' backwards). He is constantly on guard against attacks from Gustav Van Helsing, as well as Gustav's young nephews — Maximilian and Christopher Townsend.  They were also aided by a schoolgirl, Sophie Metternich.  Romantic tensions developed between Chris and Sophie.

The series formula was relatively straightforward, with the four heroes learning of some plot by Lucard/Dracula and attempting to foil it, with at least some success.  In keeping with Bram Stoker's 1897 novel, but not most film and television lore, vampires could walk in sunlight but lacked their powers.  Anyone bitten just once by a vampire transformed into a zombie-like servant.  This process could be stopped by applying holy water to the bite.

Cast

Main cast
 Bernard Behrens as Gustav Helsing
 Geordie Johnson as Alexander Lucard
 Mia Kirshner as Sophie Metternich
 Joe Roncetti as Christopher Townsend
 Jacob Tierney as Max Townsend

Guest cast

Guest stars for the show were a cross-section of Canadian television and theatre talent, including Geraint Wyn Davies, who played Gustav's son Klaus, who had been turned into a vampire. He went on to play the vampire Nick Knight in the series Forever Knight. Other notables included Stratford and Shaw festival veteran Jonathan Welsh, well known television and film actors Kim Coates (from Prison Break) and Barry Morse (from The Fugitive and Space: 1999), Chas Lawther, Kirsten Kieferle (from Degrassi: The Next Generation), and Marina Anderson-Carradine, best known for managing (and then marrying) actor David Carradine.

Production
The series was filmed in Luxembourg, and produced by Phil Bedard and Larry Lalonde, best known for their work on John Woo's Once a Thief and Kung Fu: The Legend Continues.

Episodes

See also
Vampire film
List of vampire television series

References

External links 
 

1990 American television series debuts
1991 American television series endings
1990s Canadian drama television series
1990 Canadian television series debuts
1991 Canadian television series endings
Dracula television shows
Vampires in television
Television series by Halcyon Studios
First-run syndicated television programs in the United States
First-run syndicated television shows in Canada
Works set in castles